Fairview is an unincorporated community in Twin Falls County, Idaho, United States, roughly  south-southwest of Buhl.

Fairview is part of the Twin Falls, Idaho Metropolitan Statistical Area.

See also

References

Unincorporated communities in Idaho
Unincorporated communities in Twin Falls County, Idaho